Nardenk (Iranian:ﻧﺎﺭﺩﻧﻚ) is an Ottoman sauce primarily made of Pomegranate, sometimes cherry plum, Cornus mas, Bitter orange  or other varieties of plum.

Nardenk is used for fried or grilled meat, poultry and potato dishes, and has a place in Ottoman cuisine similar to the one ketchup has in the United States. It can be made at home.

See also
 List of plum dishes
 List of dips
 List of sauces
 Pomegranate molasses

References

Turkish cuisine
Plum dishes
Sauces
Sour foods